The Fury of a Patient Man is a 2016 Spanish thriller film directed by Raúl Arévalo. The film won four Goya Awards, including Best Film, Best New Director, Best Supporting Actor for Manolo Solo, and Best Original Screenplay.

Plot
The film is set in Madrid in August 2007. Curro is imprisoned after taking part in the robbery of a jewellery store. Eight years later, he leaves prison with the intention of beginning a new life, together with his girlfriend Ana and his son, but he encounters an unexpected situation and a stranger, José, who will take him to an unknown course, close to vengeance.

Cast

Production
The film was produced by La Canica Films and Agosto AIE in association with Film Factory and Palomar, with the participation of RTVE and Movistar+ and the collaboration of ICAA and Crea SGR.

Release 
The film made its debut in the Horizons section at the 73rd Venice International Film Festival. It was also screened in the Discovery section at the 2016 Toronto International Film Festival. Distributed by Entertainment One Films Spain, it was theatrically released in Spain on 9 September 2016.

Awards and nominations

|-
| align = "center" rowspan="27" | 2017 || rowspan = "2" | 22nd Forqué Awards || colspan = "2" | Best Film ||  || rowspan = "2" | 
|-
| Best Actor || Antonio de la Torre || 
|-
| rowspan="7" | 4th Feroz Awards
| colspan=2 | Best Drama Film
|  || rowspan = "7" | 
|-
| Best Director
| Raúl Arévalo
| 
|-
| Best Screenplay
| Raúl Arévalo & David Pulido
| 
|-
|  Best Main Actor
| Antonio de la Torre
| 
|-
| Best Supporting Actor
| Manolo Solo
| 
|-
| Best Supporting Actress
| Ruth Díaz
| 
|-
| colspan=2 | Best Film Poster
| 
|-
| rowspan=11 | 31st Goya Awards
| colspan=2 | Best Film
|  || rowspan = "11" | 
|-
| rowspan = "2" | Best Actor
| Antonio de la Torre
| 
|-
| Luis Callejo 
| 
|-
| Best Supporting Actor
| Manolo Solo
| 
|-
| Best New Actor
| Raúl Jiménez
| 
|-
| Best New Actress
| Ruth Díaz
| 
|-
| Best Original Screenplay
| Raúl Arévalo & David Pulido
| 
|-
| Best New Director
| Raúl Arévalo
| 
|-
| Best Cinematography
| Arnau Valls Colomer
| 
|-
| Best Editing
| Ángel Hernández Zoido
| 
|-
| Best Costume Design
| Alberto Valcárcel & Cristina Rodríguez
| 
|-
| rowspan = "6" | 26th Actors and Actresses Union Awards || rowspan = "2" | Best Film Actor in a Leading Role || Antonio de la Torre ||  || rowspan = "6" | 
|-
| Luis Callejo || 
|-
| Best Film Actress in a Minor Role || Pilar Gómez || 
|-
| Best Film Actor in a Minor Role || Manolo Solo || 
|-
| Best New Actress || Ruth Díaz || 
|-
| Best New Actor || Font García || 
|-
| 59th Ariel Awards || colspan = "2" | Best Ibero-American Film ||  || 
|}

Remake
In July 2017, Studio 8 acquired the rights to remake the film, with Albert Hughes set to direct and The Picture Company will co-produce the remake.

References

External links
 

2016 films
2016 thriller films
Spanish thriller films
2010s Spanish-language films
Films featuring a Best Supporting Actor Goya Award-winning performance
Best Film Goya Award winners
2016 directorial debut films
Films set in Madrid
2010s Spanish films
Spanish films about revenge